Scorpion: Disfigured is a first-person shooter with a futuristic setting. It is a classic shooter that incorporates many features from other games of the genre. It features 8 weapons, including numerous traditional and futuristic rifles.

Setting
Scorpion: Disfigured has a unique setting, which take place in a futuristic world that is on the brink of reverting to a time similar to the Middle Ages.

Gameplay
The player has access to two different types of grenades, for use against gun turrets and enemies. There are five varied special abilities, which include night vision, slow-motion and an energy shield. The game features role-playing elements, containing a limited number of upgrades for each special ability. There are twenty large levels, stylised with four different graphic backdrops to provide an estimated twenty-five hours of game play. There are twenty-three types of enemies, each with unique AI behavior. Because of the intelligent and unpredictable AI behavior, Scorpion: Disfigured features very tactically challenging combat. The game has been praised by its creators for its impressive in-game graphics and vast number of special effects.

Reception

Scorpion: Disfigured received negative reviews from critics upon release. On Metacritic, the game holds a score of 44/100 based on 5 reviews, indicating "generally unfavorable reviews."

References

External links
  

2009 video games
First-person shooters
Video games developed in Ukraine
Video games set in the future
Windows games
Windows-only games